Clepsis flavidana is a species of moth of the family Tortricidae. It is found in North America, where it has been recorded from Manitoba, Maryland, Minnesota and Wisconsin.

The wingspan is 26–28 mm. Adults have been recorded on wing from June to August.

The larvae feed on Rosa species.

References

Moths described in 1923
Clepsis
Moths of North America